Manuel "Manny" Súarez (born 12 November 1993) is a Chilean-Spanish basketball player who has competed internationally on the Chilean national team.

Raised in Cliffside Park, New Jersey, Súarez attended Cliffside Park High School before transferring to Marist High School.

College career
He played for the 2014–15 Fordham Rams.  

In 2015, he transferred to Adelphi. In the last year at Adelphi, Súarez averaged 13.2 points, 7.7 rebounds and 2.5 blocks per game. He recorded six double-doubles.  

In 2017, Greg McDermott recruited him to play for Creighton. About thirty college basketball teams had expressed interest in signing Suárez. He later graduated from Creighton.

Professional career
In 2020-21 he played for Iraurgi SB. In the 2021-22 season he has been with the Hungarian team Hübner Nyíregyháza BS. In September, 2022, he has signed with Balkan in the Bulgarian NBL.

National team career
Upon graduation from Creighton, Súarez joined the Chilean national team. He later played at the 2023 FIBA Basketball World Cup qualification.

Player profile
He is ambidextrous and can play as small forward, power forward or center.

Personal

He is a Chilean citizen through his mother Mapi who moved to the United States. His father is Spaniard. Suarez has a sister named María Teresa.

He recalls that playing in the NBA has been his dream since he was eight years old.

References

External links
Profile at Eurobasket.com
Creighton bio
Profile at realGM.com
Profile at Proballers.com
Profile at scoutBasketball

1993 births
Living people
Adelphi Panthers men's basketball players
Basketball players from New Jersey
Chilean expatriate basketball people in Spain
Chilean expatriate sportspeople in Bulgaria
Chilean expatriate sportspeople in the United States
Chilean expatriates in Hungary
Chilean men's basketball players
Chilean people of Spanish descent
Centers (basketball)
Cliffside Park High School alumni
Creighton Bluejays men's basketball players
Fordham Rams men's basketball players
People from Cliffside Park, New Jersey
Sportspeople from Bergen County, New Jersey
Spanish men's basketball players